Martin Brill (March 13, 1906 – April 30, 1973) was an American football player and coach.  He served as the head coach for the Staten Island Stapletons of the National Football League (NFL) during the 1931 season.   Brill was the head football coach at La Salle University from 1933 to 1939 and at Loyola Marymount University from 1940 to 1941, compiling a career college football coaching record of 40–35–6. Brill died of a heart attack at age 67 on April 30, 1973 in Los Angeles, California.

Playing career
Brill played football as freshman at the University of Pennsylvania in 1927 before transferring to the University of Notre Dame, where he played from 1929 to 1930.  He received All-American honors in 1930 as a halfback with the Irish.

Head coaching record

College

References

1906 births
1973 deaths
American football halfbacks
Columbia Lions football coaches
Loyola Lions football coaches
La Salle Explorers football coaches
Notre Dame Fighting Irish football coaches
Notre Dame Fighting Irish football players
Penn Quakers football players
Staten Island Stapletons coaches
Sportspeople from Philadelphia
Players of American football from Philadelphia